This article lists political parties in Uganda. Until a constitutional referendum in July 2005, only one political organization, the Movement (also called the National Resistance Movement) was allowed to operate in Uganda. The president, who also chairs the Movement, maintained that the Movement was not a political party, but a mass organization that claimed the loyalty of all Ugandans.

Until the 2005 referendum, the 1995 constitution had required the suspension of political parties while the Movement organization was in governance. Other political parties could technically exist but were prohibited from sponsoring candidates and holding meetings.

Registered political parties are now allowed to operate openly and contest elections. However, sometimes they find hardship in practicing their rights by the party in power.

Active political parties

Parties with parliamentary representation

Other parties 

As of September 2020, the Uganda Electoral Commission lists 26 registered political parties on its website. Some of the listed parties include the following:

 Activist Party
Alliance for National Transformation 
Congress Service Volunteers Organisation
Conservative Party 
 Ecological Party of Uganda
 Forum for Integrity in Leadership
 Green Partisan Party
 Liberal Democratic Transparency Party
 National Convention For Democracy
 National Peasants’ Party
 People's Development Party 
 People’s United Movement
 Republican Women and Youth Party
 Revolutionary People’s Party
 Social Democratic Party
 Society for Peace and Development
 Uganda Economic Party
 Uganda Federal Alliance
 Uganda Patriotic Movement

Defunct political parties
 Kabaka Yekka

Uganda People's Movement

See also
 Politics of Uganda
 List of political parties by country
 Uganda Salvation Front

References

External links
 Uganda Political Parties Meet - 5 March 2012

Uganda
 
Political parties
Political parties
Uganda